Walter F. Timilty, Jr. (born July 19, 1969) is a Democratic member of the Massachusetts Senate from the Norfolk, Bristol and Plymouth district. Previously, he represented the 7th Norfolk District in the Massachusetts House of Representatives.

Academic and political career
He is a graduate of Milton Academy, Boston College, and the Southern New England School of Law.  In addition to his time in the House, Timilty served as a Town Meeting Member in Milton, and as a member of the Milton Democratic Town Committee. He was elected to the Massachusetts House of Representatives in 1998. He was re-elected in 2010, 2012, and 2014 without opposition. Timilty's district included portions of Milton and Randolph, Massachusetts. In 2016, Timilty ran for State Senate and defeated independent candidate Jonathan Lott in the general election with 73.9% of the vote.

Timilty family 
Timilty's cousins include State Senator James Timilty and James' sister Kelly Timilty (a member of the Massachusetts Governor's Council). His uncle, their father, is former State Senator Joseph Timilty.

See also
 2019–2020 Massachusetts legislature
 2021–2022 Massachusetts legislature
The Timilty family
https://www.senatorwaltertimilty.com/

References 

1969 births
Living people
Democratic Party Massachusetts state senators
Democratic Party members of the Massachusetts House of Representatives
People from Milton, Massachusetts
Milton Academy alumni
Boston College alumni
University of Massachusetts Dartmouth alumni
21st-century American politicians
Timilty family